Tomáš Procházka (born 14 April 1981) is a professional Czech football player who currently plays for SK Kladno. He was club captain for Viktoria Žižkov in the 2010–11 season.

References

External links
 
 Guardian Football
 

Czech footballers
1981 births
Living people
Czech First League players
FC Viktoria Plzeň players
FK Mladá Boleslav players
SK Kladno players
FK Viktoria Žižkov players
Association football midfielders